Jonathan Richards is an American author, journalist, actor, and cartoonist.  He was born in Washington, DC, in 1941, and educated at South Kent School and Brown University.

As author

Nick & Jake, written with his brother Tad Richards (Arcade Publishing, 2012, is an epistolary novel set in the Joseph McCarthy era in 1953, and mixes characters drawn from life and from classic fiction. The Richards brothers’ previous novels include the three-volume Whitmarsh Chronicles, a generational trilogy set against the background of the American labor movement; and Cherokee Bill, historical fiction set in the Indian Territory in the waning days of the Old West.  Solo novels include Tularosa, a historical novel, and  Santa Fe, a contemporary novel of greed and growth in the capital of New Mexico.

As cartoonist
His political cartoons are seen regularly on the website WhoWhatWhy
  
Book illustration includes Cosmo by Alan Arkin.

As film critic
He is a member of the Online Film Critics Society.

References

1941 births
Living people
Writers from Washington, D.C.
American cartoonists
American film critics
Online Film Critics Society
South Kent School alumni
21st-century American novelists
American male novelists
21st-century American male writers
21st-century American non-fiction writers
American male non-fiction writers